Vittorio Jano (22 April 1891 – 13 March 1965) was an Italian automobile designer of Hungarian descent from the 1920s through 1960s.

Jano was born Viktor János in San Giorgio Canavese, in Piedmont, to Hungarian immigrants, who arrived there several years earlier. He began at the car and truck company Società Torinese Automobili Rapid owned by G.B. Ceirano. In 1911 he moved to Fiat under Luigi Bazzi. He moved with Bazzi to Alfa Romeo in 1923 to replace Giuseppe Merosi as chief engineer. 

At Alfa Romeo his first design was the 8-cylinder in-line mounted P2 Grand Prix car, which won Alfa Romeo the inaugural world championship for Grand Prix cars in 1925. In 1932, he produced the sensational P3 model which later was raced with great success by Enzo Ferrari when he began Scuderia Ferrari in 1933.

For Alfa road cars Jano developed a series of small-to-medium-displacement 4-, 6-, and 8-cylinder inline power plants based on the P2 unit that established the classic architecture of Alfa engines, with light alloy construction, hemispherical combustion chambers, centrally located plugs, two rows of overhead valves per cylinder bank and dual overhead cams. In 1936 he designed the Alfa Romeo 12C using a V12 engine. The car was not successful and this is given as the reason for Vittorio Jano's resignation from Alfa Romeo at the end of 1937.

That same year, Jano moved to Lancia. Among his designs at Lancia was the Grand Prix effort.  The car, the Lancia D50, was introduced in 1954, but 1955's loss of Alberto Ascari and the 1955 Le Mans disaster soured the company on GP racing.  Ferrari took over the effort and inherited Jano that same year.

Jano's contribution to Ferrari was significant. Immediately he began work on a new V12 engine to replace the existing inline-4-engined sports cars. In 1956 his new Jano V12 engine was introduced in the Ferrari 290 MM. The new series of the Jano-engined sports cars helped secure two World Sportscar Championship titles. With the encouragement of Enzo's son, Alfredo, the Jano's V6 engines pushed the bigger Lampredi and Colombo engines aside in some races. After Dino's death, Jano's "Dino" V6 became the basis for the company's Formula Two and Tasman Series efforts. Later, with experience in both Ferrari and Dino mid-engine sports prototypes it laid the groundwork for their first mid-engined road car, the 1967 Dino 206 GT. The V6 and V8 went on to displace Ferrari's V12 focus and their descendants continue to be used today.

Like Enzo Ferrari, Jano lost his own son in 1965. He became gravely ill that same year and committed suicide in Turin.

References

External links
Grand Prix History – Hall of Fame , Vittorio Jano

1891 births
1965 suicides
People from San Giorgio Canavese
Hungarian automotive engineers
Alfa Romeo people
Ferrari people
Italian automotive engineers
Italian motorsport people
Formula One designers
Suicides in Italy
20th-century Italian engineers
1965 deaths